Sweet Nothing is a 1995 drama film directed by Gary Winick and starring Michael Imperioli, Mira Sorvino and Paul Calderón. The film was inspired from real-life diary pages found by the filmmakers in a Bronx apartment.

Plot

After his wife Monika gives birth to his second child, Angel goes out to celebrate. Angel’s friend Ray offers him his first hit of crack cocaine and he gets hooked on the drug. With the hesitant support of Monika, Angel decides to deal drugs for a short period to get the family out of debt and afford nice things for them. However, as Angel’s addiction grows, his involvement in dealing increases, with his family taking the toll.

Cast
 Michael Imperioli as Angelo
 Mira Sorvino as Monika
 Paul Calderón as Ray
 Lisa Langford as Edna (as Lisa Langford)
 Patrick Breen as Greg
 Maria Tucci as Monika's Mother
 Christopher Marquette as Richie
 Sean Marquette as young Richie
 Michele Casey as Annie
 Carlos Yensi as Jose
 Brian Tarantina as Dee Dee
 Jean La Marre as Beany
 Bruce Smolanoff as Mal
 William Rothlein as Rodriguez
 Anibal O. Lleras as Georgy
 Billie Neal as Rio
 George T. Odom as Spanky (as George Odom)
 Richard Bright as Jack the Cop
 Chuck Cooper as Mark the Cop
 Michael Sorvino as Waiting Customer
 John Imperioli as Waiting Customer
 John E. O'Keefe as Howard
 Joyce Phillips as Nurse (voice)

Reception 
Though critics were divided by the film’s story, with some calling it a "darkly filmed anti-drug public service announcement", the performances of Imperioli and Sorvino were praised. Michael Wilmington of the Chicago Tribune commented Imperioli gives "one of the best balanced, most intelligent pieces of acting in any American film this year."

Roger Ebert gave a positive review and wrote, "In Sweet Nothing [Imperioli] shows a new maturity and command in his acting, maybe because he is given a key role that runs all the way through. He doesn't fall for the actor's temptation of making too many emotional choices; he understands that many of Angel's problems are very simple: He wants to use more drugs than he can afford. For Mira Sorvino, this is a new kind of role, and she is very good in it, as a woman who wants to hold her marriage and family together, who is willing to give her husband the benefit of the doubt, who believes more than she should, stays longer than she should, and finally finds the strength to act for herself."

References

External links

1995 films
1995 independent films
Films directed by Gary Winick
1995 drama films
American drama films
Films about drugs
Films about addiction
Films set in the Bronx
1990s American films
1990s English-language films